Archaeoses magicosema is a moth in the family Cossidae. It is found in Australia, where it has been recorded from New South Wales.

References

Cossidae